Morata may refer to:

People 
Álvaro Morata (born 1992), Spanish footballer
Christian Joseph Morata Bautista (born 1981), Filipino singer, actor, host, and model
Olympia Fulvia Morata (1526–1555), Italian classical scholar
Ursula Micaela Morata (1628–1703), nun, mystic, and founder of the convent of the Capuchin Poor Clares in Alicante, Spain

Places
Morata, Papua New Guinea, suburb of Port Moresby, the capital city of Papua New Guinea
Morata de Jalón, municipality located in the province of Zaragoza, Aragon, Spain
Morata de Jiloca, municipality located in the province of Zaragoza, Aragon, Spain
Morata de Tajuña, municipality located in the province of Madrid, Spain

See also
14643 Morata, a main-belt asteroid
Morada (disambiguation)
Moratia
Moretta
Morita (disambiguation)
Murata (disambiguation)

Spanish-language surnames